The 2019 Empire Slovak Open was a professional tennis tournament played on outdoor clay courts. It was the eleventh edition of the tournament which was part of the 2019 ITF Women's World Tennis Tour. It took place in Trnava, Slovakia between 13 and 19 May 2019.

Singles main-draw entrants

Seeds

 1 Rankings are as of 6 May 2019.

Other entrants
The following players received wildcards into the singles main draw:
  Tímea Babos
  Jana Čepelová
  Tereza Mihalíková
  Lenka Stará

The following players received entry from the qualifying draw:
  Denisa Allertová
  Başak Eraydın
  Réka Luca Jani
  Cornelia Lister
  Laura-Ioana Paar
  Ellen Perez
  Luisa Stefani
  Kimberley Zimmermann

Champions

Singles

 Bernarda Pera def.  Anna Blinkova, 7–5, 7–5

Doubles

 Anna Blinkova /  Xenia Knoll def.  Cornelia Lister /  Renata Voráčová, 7–5, 7–5

References

External links
 2019 Empire Slovak Open at ITFtennis.com
 Official website

2019 ITF Women's World Tennis Tour
2019 in Slovak sport